The Pluto Plus is an Unmanned Underwater Vehicle (UUV) designed for use in underwater mine identification and destruction by militaries. The vehicle is battery operated, has a maximum speed of 6 kt, and an endurance of 2 to 6 hours. Its ability to be fitted with a wireless link makes it suitable for counter-terrorism purposes. The Pluto's UUV family is developed and build by the company Gaymarine Srl in Lomazzo (Italy). The Columbia Group is the exclusive licensee for fabrication of the Pluto Plus in the United States.

References 

Robotic submarines